The Juine is a French river,  long. It is a left tributary of the river Essonne.

Its source is in Loiret, in the forest of Chambaudoin, less than 3 km south-west from Autruy-sur-Juine.  Its name originates in the hamlet of Juines which she runs alongside before re-entering the Essonne department, in which it runs through several communes:
Méréville, Saint-Cyr-la-Rivière, Ormoy-la-Rivière, Étampes, Étréchy, Chamarande, Janville-sur-Juine, Bouray-sur-Juine, Lardy.

It also runs through the parks of several châteaux (Saint-Vrain, Chamarande, and Mesnil-Voisin) and once served several now-abandoned mills.  From the 15th to the 18th century, it combined with the Essonne and Seine rivers to form a navigable waterway for flat-bottomed boats carrying wheat from Beauce towards Paris. It joins the river Essonne between Itteville and Vert-le-Petit, near Ballancourt-sur-Essonne.

Communes it runs through 

 In Loiret 
 Autruy-sur-Juine

 In Essonne 
 Méréville ~ Saclas ~ Saint-Cyr-la-Rivière ~ Boissy-la-Rivière ~ Ormoy-la-Rivière ~ Étampes ~ Morigny-Champigny ~ Étréchy ~ Auvers-Saint-Georges ~ Chamarande ~ Lardy ~ Janville-sur-Juine ~ Bouray-sur-Juine ~ Saint-Vrain ~ Itteville ~ Vert-le-Petit

Tributaries 

 The  river Eclimon, whose source is at Abbéville-la-Rivière and which runs into the Juine level with Boissy-la-Rivière
 The  la Marette stream - source at Guillerval, flows into the Juine at Saclas
 The river Chalouette - source at Chalou-Moulineux, flows into the Juine level with Étampes

References

Rivers of Essonne
Rivers of Loiret
Rivers of France
Rivers of Centre-Val de Loire
Rivers of Île-de-France